Levingston is a family name originating in Scotland as a habitational name derived from Livingston in Lothian which was originally named in Middle English Levingston. This place name was originally named after a man named Levin who appears in several 12th century charters. In Ireland (and in some cases in the Highlands of Scotland), the name was adopted by those there exiled royals of Ulaidh (province) or L. Ultonia bearing the Gaelic surnames Ó Duinnshléibhe and Mac Duinnshléibhe (anglicized Dunleavy) and, also, in Ireland and Scotland, later, known as the Mac an Ultaigh (var. Ulaidh) (anglicized MacNulty). Levingston may refer to:

 Bashir Levingston (born 1976), American football player
 Cliff Levingston (born 1961), basketball player
 Frank Levingston (1905-2016), United States military veteran
 James Levingston, 1st Earl of Newburgh (1622–1670), Scottish peer
 Roberto M. Levingston (born 1920), Argentine Army officer and de facto president of Argentina
 William Levingston, pseudonym of William Avery Rockefeller

See also 
 MacDunleavy (dynasty)
 Livingston (disambiguation)
 Livingstone (disambiguation)
 Clan MacLea, many members of which carry the name
 Livingston, West Lothian, also known as Levingston, the assumed origin of the surname

English-language surnames
Surnames of Scottish origin
Irish royal families